Shirin of Bavand or Om-e Rostam (means mother of Rostam) was the first female monarch of Iran after muslim conquest of Persia. She was ruling Rey, Iran, Mazandaran Province, Gilan Province, Hamadan and Isfahan.

When Mahmud of Ghazni sent an ambassador to her to ask her to surrender, she answered:

Her smart answer change Mahmud's decision for attack and he didn't attack Rey till end of his life.

She died in age of 80.

See also
Diang of Persia

References

Monarchs of Persia
11th-century Iranian people
Bavand dynasty